Monte Plata is a town and municipality (municipio) and the capital of the Monte Plata province in the Dominican Republic. It includes the municipal districts (distritos municipal) of Boyá, Chirino, and Don Juan.

History
Monte Plata was founded by residents of the towns of Monte Cristi and Puerto Plata, whose destruction was ordered by the king of Spain and carried-out by Antonio Ozorio, Governor of the Island. The name is a portmanteau of the names of the two cities MONTE Cristi and Puerto PLATA.  The founders of Monte Plata were 87 families from the two previously mentioned cities.

Climate

Hydrology
In the municipality the main rivers are the Ozama and the Yabacao.  Other rivers are the tributaries, Yamasá, Mijo, Sabita and Guanuma.

Culture
Monte Plata possesses a wealth of folkloric elements and rich culture. Some of its best-known cultural elements are its folk songs, folk dances, oral and written traditions, historic monuments, and popular folk beliefs.

Gallery

References

Populated places in Monte Plata Province
Municipalities of the Dominican Republic
Populated places established in 1606